This is a list of mountains of Switzerland above 800 metres whose summits are accessible by public transport. This list includes mountains with a topographic prominence of at least 30 metres that have a station above the height of their key col and within 120 metres (height difference) from the summit. The station can be reached by cable car, funicular, railway or bus. This list notably includes the Klein Matterhorn and the Säntis, respectively the highest and the most prominent peaks of Europe with public transport access. It also includes the Chasseral, the most isolated summit of the country accessible to pedestrians.

This list does not include ski lifts. For a list of ski areas, see List of ski areas and resorts in Switzerland. For a general list of mountains, see List of mountains of Switzerland.

List

See also

List of aerial tramways in Switzerland
List of funiculars in Switzerland
List of mountain railways in Switzerland
List of highest paved roads in Switzerland
List of buildings and structures in Switzerland above 3000 m
Lists of tourist attractions in Switzerland

References

External links
Mountain railways (MySwitzerland.com)
Switzerland Mobility (map with all public transport stations)

Access
Mountaineering in Switzerland
Mountains